The Consensus 1998 College Basketball All-American team, as determined by aggregating the results of four major All-American teams.  To earn "consensus" status, a player must win honors from a majority of the following teams: the Associated Press, the USBWA, The Sporting News and the National Association of Basketball Coaches.

In 1998, the Sporting News was added as a contributing source to the consensus teams, belatedly replacing the UPI All-American team, which ceased to exist after 1996.

1998 Consensus All-America team

Individual All-America teams

AP Honorable Mention:

 Chad Austin, Purdue
 Toby Bailey, UCLA
 Corey Benjamin, Oregon State
 Corey Brewer, Oklahoma
 Louis Bullock, Michigan
 Cory Carr, Texas Tech
 Anthony Carter, Hawaii
 Ed Cota, North Carolina
 Michael Doleac, Utah
 Khalid El-Amin, Connecticut
 Evan Eschmeyer, Northwestern
 Steve Goodrich, Princeton
 J. R. Henderson, UCLA
 Larry Hughes, Saint Louis
 Sam Jacobson, Minnesota
 DeMarco Johnson, Charlotte
 Charles Jones, Long Island
 Mike Jones, TCU
 De'Teri Mayes, Murray State
 BJ McKie, South Carolina
 Roshown McLeod, Duke
 Andre Miller, Utah
 Brad Miller, Purdue
 Nazr Mohammed, Kentucky
 Michael Olowokandi, Pacific
 Ruben Patterson, Cincinnati
 Laron Profit, Maryland
 Jeff Sheppard, Kentucky
 Brian Skinner, Baylor
 Kenny Thomas, New Mexico
 Robert Traylor, Michigan
 Jeremy Veal, Arizona State
 Tyson Wheeler, Rhode Island
 Shammond Williams, North Carolina
 Steve Wojciechowski, Duke

References

NCAA Men's Basketball All-Americans
All-Americans